William Henry Haile (September 23, 1833 – February 13, 1901) was an American businessman and politician who served as the Mayor of Springfield, Massachusetts in 1881, and as the 35th Lieutenant Governor for the Commonwealth of Massachusetts from 1890 to 1893.

Early life
William Haile was born in Chesterfield, New Hampshire on September 23, 1833 to William and Sabrana (Walker) Haile.

Illness and death
Haile died of kidney trouble at his home on Chestnut Street, in Springfield, Massachusetts on February 13, 1901. He had been ill for more than a year.

References
 Bacon, Edwin Monroe: Boston of To-Day: a Glance at its History and Characteristics. p. 248, (1892).

Notes

1833 births
1901 deaths
Lieutenant Governors of Massachusetts
People from Chesterfield, New Hampshire
Mayors of Springfield, Massachusetts
Republican Party Massachusetts state senators
Republican Party members of the New Hampshire House of Representatives
19th-century American politicians